This is a list of airports in Angola, sorted by location.

Angola, officially the Republic of Angola, is a country in south-central Africa bordered by Namibia on the south, Democratic Republic of the Congo on the north, and Zambia on the east; its west coast is on the Atlantic Ocean. The exclave province of Cabinda has a border with the Republic of the Congo and the Democratic Republic of the Congo. Angola is divided into eighteen provinces and 163 municipalities. The country's official language is Portuguese and its capital is Luanda.



Airports 

Airport names shown in bold indicate the facility has scheduled passenger service on a commercial airline.

The airports are managed by the company Empresa Nacional de Exploração de Aeroportos e Navegação Aérea (ENANA - National company to manage airports and air navigation).

References

See also 
 Empresa Nacional de Exploração de Aeroportos e Navegação Aérea E.P.
 National Air Force of Angola
 Transport in Angola
 List of airports by ICAO code: F#FN - Angola
 Wikipedia:WikiProject Aviation/Airline destination lists: Africa#Angola

External links 
 Comprehensive list of airports by category at official ENANA website
 
  - includes IATA codes
 Great Circle Mapper: Airports in Angola - IATA and ICAO codes, runway information
 World Aero Data: Angola - ICAO codes, runway information

Angola
 
Airports
Airports
Angola